Elise Ashlyn Trouw (born April 27, 1999) is an American singer-songwriter, multi-instrumentalist and record producer.

Early life and education
Born in Newport Beach, California to a South African father Arie Trouw and New Yorker mother Anne, Trouw moved to San Diego at an early age.  At six, she learned to play the piano with the intent of being able to play "My Immortal" by Evanescence. At age ten, she started drum lessons with instructor Dave Blackburn in Fallbrook, California, after playing the faux drums on the video game Rock Band.

Trouw attended The Bishop's School (La Jolla) from 7th to 11th grade, graduating before her senior year to pursue her music career. While attending Bishop's she was also selected to be a member of the Grammy Foundation's Grammy Camp alumni band, allowing her to perform alongside Sam Hunt at Club Nokia (since renamed The Novo) on February 11, 2016.

Career
Trouw was signed in November 2015 to a one-album record deal by Pacific Records of San Diego. In September 2016, she left Pacific Records, buying out her contract, and retaining all rights to her music. By October 2016, she had released four singles - "X Marks the Spot", "She Talking", "Your Way", and "Burn".

On February 24, 2017, Trouw released her ten-song debut album, Unraveling, under her own label, Goober Records based in San Diego. The album features her on drums, vocals, guitar, piano, and bass guitar; the tracks were mixed and mastered by Alan Sanderson and Christopher Hoffee. Trouw appeared as the drummer on Fox Wilde's "Soap" music video on April 4, 2017. On May 7, 2017, Trouw celebrated the release of her debut album and her 18th birthday at The Loft at the University of California, San Diego.

In late 2017 and early 2018, she released two live looping mashup videos that achieved a considerable amount of virality on Facebook and YouTube.

She is currently listed as an endorsed artist by Pearl Drums, Paiste Cymbals and Vater Percussion.

Trouw appeared on Jimmy Kimmel Live! on February 8, 2018, after being bumped from the January 30, 2018, episode.  She was the first artist to be featured on the circular lobby stage at the show where she performed a Foo Fighters / Bobby Caldwell mashup, as well as the song "Awake."

In 2019, she toured as the opening act with Incubus (band) from October 16 to 27.

For the Amazon Prime feature film Sound of Metal, Elise collaborated with Travis Barker to reimagine Metallica's Enter Sandman.

Critical reception
In 2016, she was listed as one of San Diego's best new bands by SoundDiego and was named 2017 "Breakout Artist" by NBC 7's SoundDiego.

Influences 
Her influences include Radiohead, The Police, Adele, John Mayer, and Tower of Power.

Discography
 Unraveling (2017)
 2017–2019 Collection (2020)
 Studio Live Session – Little Big Beat Studio (2020)
 Scary Pockets – Best Of 2020 Cover of "Dreams" by Fleetwood Mac (2021)
Losing Sleep EP (2023)

References

External links
 
 

1999 births
Living people
21st-century American women pianists
21st-century American pianists
Alternative rock drummers
Alternative rock singers
American alternative rock musicians
American child singers
American women drummers
American women singer-songwriters
American multi-instrumentalists
American pop pianists
American pop rock singers
American rock songwriters
Child pop musicians
Musicians from San Diego
Singer-songwriters from California
21st-century American drummers
21st-century American women singers
21st-century American singers